Edgbaston High School for Girls is a private day school for girls aged  to 18 in the Edgbaston area of Birmingham, England.

History
In 1846, Elizabeth Brady founded a school in Edgbaston for the daughters of Quakers in 1846 and this ran for 21 years.

This school was founded in 1876 making it the oldest girls' secondary school open to the public in Birmingham. The first headmistress was Alice Cooper. The school used to be a boarding school in a different location.

Cooper strongly encouraged the teaching of science and made sure that like other schools for girls they had science equipment. She encouraged her teachers to not teach by rote and she preferred to have no external examinations until the age of 17. She encouraged sensible clothing and physical exercise. In 1881, the school staged a cricket match against another school, to which a local newspaper reacted with hostility. It produced a cartoon and wrote a passage of its opinions towards the upcoming match.

In 1882, the school paid for her to visit a large number of American schools. She returned and reported on their better equipment and she saw some advantage in co-education.

Structure
Westbourne is the Pre-Preparatory Department of the school. It is split into three stages, organised by the age of the child. The Octagon Nursery is available for children from the age of 2 and above. The nursery opened in September 2004. Following this is the Kindergarten for children of the age of three. In the September following the child's fourth birthday, they can move into Reception.

The Preparatory Department is the second department in the school. It consists of years one to six. Each year is split into four houses; Curie, Frank, Johnson and Nightingale. In Years One, Two and Three forms are primarily taught by their form teacher with specialist teaching in French, music and physical education. More specialist teaching is introduced as pupils move from Year Four through to Year Six. These two departments form the Lower School.

The Senior School is third department in the school. It consists of Years Seven to Eleven, preparing the students for GCSEs and A-levels. Following this the students may move on into the sixth form centre, the fourth department. Sixth Form students are required to wear a suit which is conservative in style. There are five houses: St Patrick, St David, St Andrew, St George, and St Francis with many House Events available such as the House Quiz or Sports Day.

Academics
The school received the 11th best GCSE results and 9th best A/ AS level results in 2006 in Birmingham.

Notable former pupils
 Mary Sturge, second woman doctor in Birmingham
 Verily Anderson, British television and play writer
 Sally Davies, medical doctor and first woman to be appointed as chief medical officer for England
 Molly Dineen, Canadian-born British documentary director, producer and cinematographer
 Elinor Wight Gardner, British university lecturer, geologist, and archaeologist
 Julia Lloyd, educationalist and pioneer of kindergartens
 Sue Lloyd, British model, television and film actress
 Helen George, television and film actress 
 Kate Williams, historian, author and television presenter
 Malala Yousafzai, women's education activist and Nobel Peace Prize laureate

References

External links
School website
EHS Old Girls' Association
Profile on MyDaughter
Profile on the ISC website

Private schools in Birmingham, West Midlands
Educational institutions established in 1876
Girls' schools in the West Midlands (county)
Member schools of the Girls' Schools Association
1876 establishments in England
Edgbaston